Carabus excellens is a species of beetle endemic to Europe, where it is observed in Belarus, Moldova, Poland, Romania, central and southern Russia, and Ukraine.

References

excellens
Beetles of Europe
Beetles described in 1798